This is a list of the National Register of Historic Places listings in Sauk County, Wisconsin. It is intended to provide a comprehensive listing of entries in the National Register of Historic Places that are located in Sauk County, Wisconsin.  The locations of National Register properties for which the latitude and longitude coordinates are included below may be seen in a map.

There are 62 properties and districts listed on the National Register in the county. Three of these are further designated as National Historic Landmarks.

Current listings

 for the C&NW.

|}

See also

List of National Historic Landmarks in Wisconsin
National Register of Historic Places listings in Wisconsin
Listings in neighboring counties: Adams, Columbia, Dane, Iowa, Juneau, Richland, Vernon

References

Sauk